Zulpha is a monotypic genus of bush crickets containing only the species Zulpha perlaria. 

Zulpha perlaria belongs to the genus group Eurypalpae within the subfamily Phaneropterinae and has been recorded from: SE China, Vietnam, the Andaman Islands and NE Australia.

References

Tettigoniidae genera
Phaneropterinae
Insects of Asia
Monotypic Orthoptera genera